Brȏz is a Croatian surname. Etymologically it is derived from the name Àmbrōzije, corresponding to English Ambrose. It is chiefly distributed in the region of Zagorje. Notable people with the surname include:

 Josip Broz Tito (1892–1980), revolutionary and statesman
 Joška Broz (born 1947), Serbian politician, grandson of Tito
 Jovanka Broz (1924–2013), widow of Yugoslav leader Josip Broz Tito
 Ivan Broz (1852–1893), Croatian linguist and literary historian
 Mišo Broz (born 1941), Croatian diplomat, son of Tito
 Saša Broz (born 1968), Croatian theatre and television director, granddauther of Tito
 Svetlana Broz (born 1955), Bosnian author and physician, granddaughter of Tito

See also
 Brozović
 Brož

Croatian surnames